Salon Seudun Sanomat is a morning broadsheet newspaper published in Salo, Finland.

History and profile
The newspaper was established in 1919. It is based in Salo. The publisher is TS-Yhtymä group which also publishes Turun Sanomat, Aamuset, Auranmaan Viikkolehti, Kaarina-lehti, Laitilan Sanomat, Loimaan Lehti, Paikallislehti Somero and Ykkössanomat. 

In 2007 Salon Seudun Sanomat had a circulation of 22,216 copies. The circulation of the paper was 19,692 copies in 2013.

References

External links
Official site

1919 establishments in Finland
Newspapers established in 1919
Daily newspapers published in Finland
Finnish-language newspapers
Mass media in Salo, Finland